Adrian Ioan Hora (born 21 August 1988) is a Romanian professional footballer who plays for FC Hermannstadt. Deployed mainly as a winger during the first part of his career, he later found more success in the centre as a main striker.

Club career
Born in Oradea in 1988, Hora started his career with youth club Oradea CSS. He started his professional career with UTA Arad in 2005, playing at the club till 2008 when he joined Gloria Bistrița. He made his debut for UTA Arad on 10 September 2006 in a 2–0 victory against Dinamo Bucuresti. Hora signed a three-year contract with the club in a 238,000 euro deal. He made his debut on 26 July in a 3–0 victory over Rapid Bucuresti. His first goal for the club came in a 2–2 draw over Steaua București. In his second season with the club, he made 30 appearances, finding the net four times.

In June 2010, Hora signed for defending Romanian Liga I champions CFR Cluj on a five-year contract. On joining the club, Hora said that he had spent "two beautiful years" at Gloria and also said that he wanted to make a mark in the UEFA Champions League. He played his first Champions League match on 15 September in a 2–1 win over Swiss club FC Basel. In 2014, he spent a loan spell at Liga II club Târgu Mureș with whom he won promotion to the first tier. He signed permanently for the club at the beginning of the 2014–15 season; where he would play 30 matches and score nine goals.

In July 2015, Hora signed a three-year contract with Pandurii Târgu Jiu. He ended the season as the league's top scorer with 20 goals.

In August 2016, Hora signed a three-year contract with Turkish side Konyaspor for an undisclosed transfer fee. He made 27 appearances in all competitions in the 2016–17 campaign, recording his sole goal in a 3–0 victory over Karabükspor on 25 May 2017.

Hora returned to Romania on 20 January 2019, penning a deal for an undisclosed period with FCSB.

On 11 February 2019, he made his debut and scored his first goal for the Roș-albaștrii in a 3–0 league victory over Hermannstadt. Thirteen days later, he helped to a 3–2 win against CS Universitatea Craiova after netting a double.

International career
In January 2015, Hora was called up to the Romania national team for the unofficial friendlies against Bulgaria, Georgia and Moldova. He came on as a 70th-minute substitute in a 0–0 draw against the former.

He earned his first official cap for the nation on 23 March 2016, replacing Bogdan Stancu in a 1–0 victory over Lithuania at the Stadionul Marin Anastasovici in Giurgiu.

Personal life
During his spell at Gloria Bistrița in 2010, Hora caused a car accident in the city of Cluj-Napoca after a match against CFR Cluj. In October 2012, the Cluj County court handed him a six-month prison sentence after he was convicted of driving the vehicle under the influence of alcohol.

Career statistics

Club

International

Honours

Club
CFR Cluj
Liga I: 2011–12
Cupa României: Runner-up 2012–13
Supercupa României: 2010; Runner-up 2012

Konyaspor
Turkish Cup: 2016–17

FCSB
Cupa României: 2019–20

Individual
Liga I top scorer: 2015–16
DigiSport Liga I Player of the Month: October 2015

References

External links

1988 births
Living people
Sportspeople from Oradea
Romanian footballers
Association football forwards
Association football wingers
Liga I players
Liga II players
FC UTA Arad players
ACF Gloria Bistrița players
CFR Cluj players
ASA 2013 Târgu Mureș players
CS Pandurii Târgu Jiu players
FC Steaua București players
CS Gaz Metan Mediaș players
FC Hermannstadt players
Süper Lig players
TFF First League players
Konyaspor footballers
Akhisarspor footballers
Elazığspor footballers
Romania under-21 international footballers
Romania international footballers
Romanian expatriate footballers
Expatriate footballers in Turkey
Romanian expatriate sportspeople in Turkey